Romulo Acosta (Tucuman, 1 September 1992) is an Argentine born rugby union player. His usual position is as a Prop and he currently plays for Rugby Lyons Piacenza in Top12.

In 2014–15 Pro12 season he played for Benetton Treviso. Acosta he also played for Benetton Treviso, as Additional Player in 2014 and 2017.

References

External links 
It's Rugby France Profile
Ultimate Rugby Profile

Argentine rugby union players
1992 births
Living people
Rugby Lyons Piacenza players
Sportspeople from Tucumán Province
Benetton Rugby players
Argentine expatriate rugby union players
Expatriate rugby union players in Italy
Argentine expatriate sportspeople in Italy
Petrarca Rugby players
Rugby union props